Errick Craven (born July 4, 1983) is an Ivorian-American former professional basketball player. He was also a member of the Côte d'Ivoire national basketball team.

High school
Craven was a local high school basketball star. He led his high school team to two straight California Division III titles, at Bishop Montgomery High School.  He was named the co-CIF Division III player of the year, in both his junior and senior seasons, along with his twin brother Derrick.

College career
Along with his twin brother, Derrick, Craven played four years of college basketball at the University of Southern California, with the USC Trojans, from 2001 to 2005. Craven was a four-year starter at USC, and he led the Pac-10 Conference in steals in each of his first three years, before an injury-filled senior season.  Craven finished his career 19th in scoring, 15th in three-point shooting, and second in steals on the USC charts.

Professional career
Following his college career, Craven played for the Dallas Mavericks' NBA Summer League team, before continuing his career overseas. Craven played professional basketball in Turkey, Venezuela, the NBA D-League, and in France. He spent the 2008–09 season with Stade Clermontois BA of the French 2nd Division, and he averaged 19.6 points per game, to go along with his average of three steals per game.

National team career
Craven was a member of the senior Côte d'Ivoire national basketball team that won the silver medal at the 2009 FIBA Africa Championship, to earn its first FIBA World Championship berth since 1986.

Personal life
Craven was born in Carson, California, on 4 July 1983. Craven attended The Thomas J. Long School of Pharmacy, at the University of the Pacific, in order to pursue a career in pharmacy.

References

External links
Eurobasket.com Profile
French League profile

1983 births
Living people
American expatriate basketball people in France
American expatriate basketball people in Turkey
American expatriate basketball people in Venezuela
American men's basketball players
American people of Ivorian descent
Basketball players from California
Cocodrilos de Caracas players
Ivorian men's basketball players
Ivorian people of African-American descent
JA Vichy players
JDA Dijon Basket players
JSA Bordeaux Basket players
Los Angeles D-Fenders players
People from Carson, California
Point guards
Saint-Vallier Basket Drôme players
Shooting guards
Sportspeople from Los Angeles County, California
Ivorian twins
American twins
Twin sportspeople
USC Trojans men's basketball players